Eckert is a tiny, isolated lunar impact crater in the northern part of the Mare Crisium (a circular region of relatively dark, flat material on the surface of the Moon). This crater forms a circular pit in the dark surface of the surrounding lunar mare. Just to the west is a wrinkle ridge in the mare surface, a feature that is prominent only under oblique lighting from the Sun. The nearest craters of note are Peirce to the west-northwest, and Picard to the southwest. Both of these craters lie in the Mare Crisium basin.

The crater is named for American astronomer Wallace John Eckert, and name was approved by the IAU in 1973.

References

 
 
 
 
 
 
 
 
 
 
 
 

Impact craters on the Moon